The 1999 Women's NORCECA Volleyball Championship was the 16th edition of the Women's Continental Volleyball Tournament, played by eight countries from September 21 to September 26, 1999, in Monterrey, Mexico.

Competing nations

Squads

Preliminary round

Group A

September 21

September 22

September 23

Group B

September 21

September 22

September 23

Final round

Quarter-finals
September 24

Semi-finals
September 25

Finals
September 24 — Seventh Place Match

September 26 — Fifth Place Match

September 26 — Bronze Medal Match

September 26 — Gold Medal Match

Final ranking

Individual awards
Most Valuable Player:  Mireya Luis

References
 Results

Women's NORCECA Volleyball Championship
N
Volleyball
1999 in women's volleyball
1999 in Mexican women's sports